Ehrhard Schmidt (18 May 1863 – 18 July 1946) was an admiral of the Kaiserliche Marine (Imperial German Navy) during World War I.

Career
At age 15 he entered the navy and saw service at several branches at sea and on land. Among them were posts on missions, as a commanding officer and in cadet training. His wish to become commander of a ship was granted in 1901 when he assumed command of the armoured cruiser . He held that command until 1907. Later he was commander of the naval artillery.

At the beginning of World War I, he was commander of the IV Squadron, made up of old  ships. During the Battle of Jutland, Schmidt commanded the I Squadron and used it as a vanguard to break through the British lines at night. In 1917 he led Operation Albion, a special task force for the occupation of the Baltic Sea islands of Saaremaa and Hiiumaa off the Estonian coast. For his achievements he was awarded the Pour le Mérite order.
Upon his request, he was retired in 1918 with the rank of Admiral à la Suite, and following the Great War, he, like many of his former comrades of similar age, did not join the Reichsmarine. He remained loyal to the spirit of the Imperial Navy.

Apart from his nomination as Honorary Chairman of the Munich Naval Association (Marineverein München), he was appointed the Honorary Leader of the Gau of Bavaria.

References

Hanns Möller. Geschichte der Ritter des Ordens pour le mérite im Weltkrieg, Vol. II: M-Z, Verlag Bernard & Graefe, Berlin 1935, pp. 274–275.

1863 births
1946 deaths
Admirals of the Imperial German Navy
Imperial German Navy admirals of World War I
Recipients of the Pour le Mérite (military class)
Recipients of the Iron Cross (1914), 1st class
People from Offenbach am Main
Military personnel from Hesse